Kim Kyung-tae (born 2 September 1986), also known as K.T. Kim, is a South Korean professional golfer who plays on the Asian and Japan Golf Tours.

Career
He won several tournaments as  an amateur, including the 2006 Japan Amateur Championship and two events on the 2006 Korean Tour. He turned professional in late 2006 and won the 2007 Maekyung Open in his second start on the Asian Tour.

In 2010, Kim won the Diamond Cup Golf, Japan Open and Mynavi ABC Championship on the Japan Golf Tour and became the first Korean golfer to lead the money list on the Tour.

Kim has played in each of the four major championships, recording top-50 finishes in each, with his best being a T30 finish at the 2011 U.S. Open. He also played in the 2011 Presidents Cup, representing the International Team in a 15–19 defeat to USA. Kim finished with a 2–2–0 record.

Kim won five events during the 2015 Japan Golf Tour season, which at the time took his overall total to ten tournament victories on the tour. This being a record for Korean players on the tour. He won a further three events during the 2016 season, including The Crowns, to take his number of Asian Tour victories to thirteen.

Amateur wins
2006 Asian Games (team and individual), Korean Amateur Championship, Japan Amateur Championship

Professional wins (21)

Japan Golf Tour wins (14)

1Co-sanctioned by the OneAsia Tour
2Co-sanctioned by the Asian Tour
 The Japan Open Golf Championship is also a Japan major championship.

Japan Golf Tour playoff record (2–1)

Asian Tour wins (2)

1Co-sanctioned by the Korean Tour
2Co-sanctioned by the Japan Golf Tour

OneAsia Tour wins (2)

1Co-sanctioned by the Korean Tour
2Co-sanctioned by the Japan Golf Tour

Korean Tour wins (6)

1Co-sanctioned by the Asian Tour
2Co-sanctioned by the OneAsia Tour

Other wins (1)

Results in major championships

CUT = missed the half-way cut
"T" = tied for place

Summary

Most consecutive cuts made – 4 (2010 Open Championship – 2011 U.S. Open)
Longest streak of top-10s – 0

Results in World Golf Championships
Results not in chronological order prior to 2015.

QF, R16, R32, R64 = Round in which player lost in match play
"T" = tied
Note that the HSBC Champions did not become a WGC event until 2009.

Team appearances
Amateur
Eisenhower Trophy (representing South Korea): 2004, 2006
Bonallack Trophy (representing Asia/Pacific): 2004 (winners), 2006

Professional
Presidents Cup (representing the International team): 2011
Royal Trophy (representing Asia): 2011, 2012 (winners), 2013
EurAsia Cup (representing Asia): 2016
World Cup (representing South Korea): 2016

See also
List of golfers with most Japan Golf Tour wins

References

External links

asiantour.com story on 2007 Maekyung Open win

South Korean male golfers
Asian Tour golfers
Japan Golf Tour golfers
Asian Games medalists in golf
Asian Games gold medalists for South Korea
Golfers at the 2006 Asian Games
Medalists at the 2006 Asian Games
Sportspeople from Gangwon Province, South Korea
1986 births
Living people